The mayor of Dunedin is the head of the local government, the city council of Dunedin, New Zealand. The mayor's role is "to provide leadership to the other elected members of the territorial authority, be a leader in the community and perform civic duties". The mayor is directly elected, using the single transferable vote (STV) system from 2007. The current mayor is Jules Radich who was elected in 2022.

The mayor has always been elected at large, with the inaugural election in 1865. Up until 1915, the term of mayor was for one year only. From 1915 to 1935, the term was two years. Since the 1935 mayoral election, the term has been three years. The role of deputy mayor was established in 1917.
The city council translates the office and title of mayor as Te Koromatua o Ōtepoti.

List of mayors of Dunedin
Key

Notes

References

External links

 DCC website – election results
 DCC website – councillors since 1865

Dunedin, New Zealand